List of primary NTHS Expressways
 List of auxiliary NTHS Expressways